Mediator complex subunit 12 like (Med12L) is a protein that in humans is encoded by the MED12L gene.

Function

The protein encoded by this gene is part of the Mediator complex, which is involved in transcriptional coactivation of nearly all RNA polymerase II-dependent genes. The Mediator complex links gene-specific transcriptional activators with the basal transcription machinery. [provided by RefSeq, May 2010].

See also 
Mediator

References

Further reading